Oleksiy Horodov (born 28 August 1978, in Ukraine) is a retired Ukrainian football midfielder and current football manager.

External links 
 Official Website Profile

1978 births
Living people
People from Rubizhne
Ukrainian footballers
Ukrainian football managers
FC Khimik Severodonetsk players
FC Zorya Luhansk players
FC Arsenal Kyiv players
FC CSKA Kyiv players
FC Spartak Ivano-Frankivsk players
FC Oleksandriya players
FC Mariupol players
FC Borysfen Boryspil players
FC Kharkiv players
FC Nyva Vinnytsia players
FC Zirka Kropyvnytskyi players
FC Poltava players
Ukrainian Premier League players
Ukrainian First League players
Ukrainian Second League players
FC Khimik Severodonetsk managers
FC Kramatorsk managers
Association football midfielders
Sportspeople from Luhansk Oblast